Welcome To The Family is a compilation album released on November 20, 2001 by Drive-Thru Records. The CD features mostly previously unreleased songs by the label's bands and is packaged in a miniature cardboard pizza box.

Track listing

 "Somewhere Down in Fullerton" (performed by Allister) – 2:44 [*]
 "Stuck" (performed by Allister) – 1:52
 "3,720 To 1" (performed by The Benjamins) – 5:46 [*]
 "O'Bleek" (performed by Fenix*TX) – 3:58 [*]
 "What It Is to Burn" (performed by Finch) – 4:52 [*]
 "Letters to You" (performed by Finch) – 3:22
 "Give It Up" (performed by Home Grown) – 2:32 [*]
 "Not Alone" (performed by Home Grown) – 3:43 [*]
 "Get It Together" (performed by Midtown) – 3:43 [*]
 "Hand Grenade" (performed by The Movielife) – 3:08
 "Come Back Bon Jovi" (performed by New Found Glory) – 2:13 [*]
 "So Many Ways" (performed by New Found Glory) – 3:01 [+]
 "Mastering The List" (performed by Rx Bandits) – 5:02 [*]
 "Analog Boy" (performed by Rx Bandits) – 3:09
 "Konstantine" (performed by Something Corporate) – 9:36 [*]
 "If U C Jordan" (performed by Something Corporate) – 4:18
 "Break Up Day" (performed by The Starting Line) – 3:53 [*]
 "Leaving" (performed by The Starting Line) – 3:29

[*] - Unreleased
[+] - Rare

2001 compilation albums
Albums produced by Mark Trombino
Albums produced by Chris Badami
Drive-Thru Records compilation albums